The Renfe 313 (originally Renfe 1300.) was a class of 6 axle mainline diesel-electric locomotives built for Renfe by Euskalduna under license from Alco. 50 units were built in the mid-1960s, locomotives surplus to Renfe's requirements were sold to Comboios de Portugal (CP), Trenes de Buenos Aires, Argentina, and to the railway company of Minero Siderúrgica de Ponferrada.

Alco's model number for the type was DL535S - RSD39

History and description

The locomotives were acquired by Renfe to replace steam engines on lines in Andalusia, La Mancha and Extremadura, and were designed to be able to operate on lines that required a low axle load. The fifty units were numbered 313–001 to 313–050; 40 were constructed under license by Euskalduna, the remainder by Alco.

The locomotives were initially supplied in yellow striped Renfe green livery, some units later received Renfe yellow grey after refurbishment.

In 1989 Comboios de Portugal acquired 18 locomotives, Trenes de Buenos Aires (TBA) acquired 17 units in 1995.

Other post-Renfe operators included rail infrastructure construction and maintenance company Guinovart & Oshsa (part of OHL Group) which acquired four units, including ex-CP locomotives, Ferrovial which acquired 313–011, and Grupo Azvi which acquired 313–005.

See also
CP class 1320, locomotives exported to Portugal

References

External links

ALCO locomotives
Diesel locomotives of Spain
313
A1A-A1A locomotives
Railway locomotives introduced in 1965
5 ft 6 in gauge locomotives
Diesel-electric locomotives of Spain